Habib Sadek is a former member of the Lebanese parliament, a poet and writer. He is the president of the Conseil Culturel Liban Sud. He was describe as a Marxist..

References

Members of the Parliament of Lebanon
Lebanese writers
20th-century Lebanese poets
Living people
Year of birth missing (living people)
Place of birth missing (living people)
Lebanese male poets
21st-century Lebanese poets
21st-century male writers